William Douglas Street Jr. was an American con artist and impersonator. His life is the basis of Wendell Harris' 1989 film Chameleon Street, winner of the Grand Jury Prize at the 1990 Sundance Film Festival.

Street, also known as "Chameleon" and "The Great Impersonator" and who is an African American who turned 64 that year, was arrested in 2015 on a warrant issued in 2013 when he allegedly bought a $7,000 Rolex using a check which bounced and on which he wrote a false home address and phone number. Following the arrest warrant issued in 2013 in Ann Arbor, Street had evaded authorities for two years until found in 2015 in Plymouth Township. Street dressed as a woman for some of the false identities he assumed, prompting Magistrate Judge Elizabeth Stafford to comment "He has proved himself to be extraordinarily resourceful in perpetuating his schemes," before denying bail.

When arrested in 1971 for extortion against the wife of Detroit Tigers' Willie Horton, Street's unusual impersonation skills were commented upon by Jet magazine which referred to his prior successful impersonation of football player Jerry Levias of the Houston Oilers as having "red-faced the Detroit Tigers baseball organization by staging a convincing impersonation" of Levias.

In September 2015, he pleaded guilty to identity theft and mail fraud. Street’s attorney, Joseph Arnone, stated that he believes this is Street's first time facing federal charges and asserted that Street's purpose in the identity theft "was to get a job. When you have his kind of [criminal] record, his kind of history — the chance of getting a job was nil." Without the plea deal, Street would have faced up to 20 years in jail. William Street's impersonations started at least as far back as 1970 (posing as a Time magazine reporter) and other false identities he assumed included those of a Houston Oilers wide receiver, an all-star football player from the University of Michigan, a physician at Henry Ford Hospital (in 1973), attorneys (1979 and 1980) and as a first-year medical student at Yale University. Staff at the Detroit Human Rights Department where he posed as an attorney volunteer found him skillful enough that  "if he ever straightens out, we wouldn't mind having him back."

In February 2016 Street was sentenced to three years in federal prison for identity theft and mail fraud. Over the preceding 46 years he had "racked up 17 criminal convictions and six arrests before pulling off this latest stunt:  stealing the identity of a defense contractor who had graduated from Duke University and the U.S. Military Academy."

His indictment included descriptions of Street sending requests for replacement diplomas and transcripts under false identity to several institutions successfully, including to Duke University. Street has been described as "a man of high intelligence but little formal education" and is alleged to have worked as a surgeon at a Chicago hospital under an assumed name and to have performed 36 hysterectomies before being discovered.

References

People from Michigan
American people convicted of mail and wire fraud
Living people
Year of birth missing (living people)